Sabine Chaouche is a French scholar who specializes in theatre and social and economic history.

Biography 
She studied at the University of Oxford (New College), where she completed a DPhil in Social and Economic History  (2017) and at the Université de Paris-Sorbonne where she completed a PhD in Literature and Theatre (1999) and an Habilitation à Diriger des Recherches (2005). As a Reader, she taught French literature and theatre in Oxford. Her books on acting and declamation in the seventeenth and eighteenth centuries have become reference works,. In recent years, she examined staging, the philosophy of performance and the economy of entertainments. She has edited almost all the theories on "actio" and baroque acting from the 1650s to the 1800s and is regarded by Konrad Schoell as "one of the most important representatives of current research into the history of the French theatre of the 17th and 18th centuries". Her multidisciplinary area of expertise includes the history of consumption and trade in nineteenth-century Europe, as well as Oxford students' daily life in the Victorian and Edwardian eras.

She is a Fellow of the Royal Historical Society and a member of the Peer Review College of the Arts and Humanities Research Council in the UK.

She is the director of the journal European Drama and Performance Studies published by Éditions Classiques Garnier and the director of the e-magazine The Frenchmag.

Publications

Books
 L'art du comédien. Declamation et jeu scénique en France à l'âge classique (Paris: Éditions Honoré Champion, 2001), reed. 2013, 456 pages. 
 La philosophie de l'Acteur. La dialectique de l'intérieur et de l'extérieur dans les écrits sur l'art théâtral français (1738-1801) (Paris: Éditions Honoré Champion, 2007), 480 pages. 
 La mise en scène du répertoire à la Comédie-Française (1680-1815) (Paris: Éditions Honoré Champion, 2013), 2 volumes, 960 pages.

Edited volumes
 Le Théâtral de la France d'Ancien Régime. De la présentation de soi à la représentation scénique (Paris: Éditions Honoré Champion, 2010), 544 pages.
 L'Opéra de Paris, la Comédie-Française, l'Opéra Comique (1672-2010) : approches comparées, co-ed with Solveig Serre et Denis Herlin (Geneva, Droz, 2012), 424 pages. 
 Le développement du "grand spectacle" en France: Politiques, gestions, innovations. 1715-1864, co-ed. with Roxane Martin, European Drama and Performance Studies, n°1 (2013), 330 pages.
 Consuming Female Performers (1850s-1950s), co-ed. with Clara Sadoun-Edouard, European Drama and Performance Studies, n°5:2 (2015), 383 pages. 
 Jean-François Regnard, Théâtre français (Paris: Éditions Classiques Garnier, 2015), vol. 1, 687 pages.
 Jean-François Regnard, Théâtre français (Paris: Éditions Classiques Garnier, 2015), vol. 2, 557 pages.  
 L'Eclairage au théâtre, co-ed. with Jean-Yves Vialleton, Revue d'Histoire du Théâtre, n°273, 2017, 144 pages. 
 Ecrire pour la scène, co-ed. with Estelle Doudet and Olivier Spina, European Drama and Performance Studies, n°9, 2017, 304 pages. 
 Jean-François Regnard, Théâtre français (Paris: Éditions Classiques Garnier), vol. 3, 2018, 413 pages.
 Masculinité et théâtre, European Drama and Performance Studies, n°10, 2018.
 The Stage and its Creative Processes, European Drama and Performance Studies, n° 13, volume 1, 2019.

Scholarly editions
 Denis Diderot, Paradoxe sur le comédien (Paris: Flammarion, 2000), 317 pages. 
 Sept Traités sur le jeu du comédien et autres textes. De l'actio oratoire à l'art dramatique, 1657-1750 (Paris: Éditions Honoré Champion, 2001), 880 pages. 
 La scène en contrechamp. Anecdotes françaises et traditions de jeu au siècle des Lumières (Paris: Éditions Honoré Champion, 2005, 160 pages. 
 Ecrits sur l'art théâtral, Spectateurs, 1753-1801 (Paris: Éditions Honoré Champion, 2005), 784 pages. 
 Ecrits sur l'art théâtral, Acteurs, 1753-1801 (Paris: Éditions Honoré Champion, 2005), 1024 pages. 
 Lettres à Eugénie, Lettres à Eulalie, Dialogue des Morts, in Prince de Ligne. Ecrits sur la société, ed. by J. V. Vercruysse (éd.) (Paris: Éditions Honoré Champion, 2010), 968 pages. 
 Les Folies amoureuses followed by Mariage de la Folie, in Jean-François Regnard, Théâtre français (Paris: Éditions Classiques Garnier, 2015), vol. 2. 
 Le Retour imprévu, in Théâtre français (Paris: Éditions Classiques Garnier, 2015), vol. 2. 
 La Sérénade, in Jean-François Regnard, Théâtre français (Paris: Éditions Classiques Garnier, 2015), vol. 1. 
 Le Joueur, in Jean-François Regnard, Théâtre français (Paris: Éditions Classiques Garnier, 2015), vol. 1.
 Le Distrait, in Jean-François Regnard, Théâtre français (Paris: Éditions Classiques Garnier, 2015), vol. 1.
 Relevés de mise en scène (1686-1823), Comédie-Française (Paris: Éditions Honoré Champion, 2015), 704 pages.
 Le Légataire universel, in Jean-François Regnard, Théâtre français (Paris: Éditions Classiques Garnier, 2018), vol. 3 (co-ed. S. Requemora).
 La Critique du Légataire, in Jean-François Regnard, Théâtre français (Paris: Éditions Classiques Garnier, 2018), vol. 3.
 Les Souhaits, in Jean-François Regnard, Théâtre français (Paris: Éditions Classiques Garnier, 2018), vol. 3.
 Les Vendanges ou le Bailli d’Asnières, in Jean-François Regnard, Théâtre français (Paris: Éditions Classiques Garnier, 2018), vol. 3 (co-ed. N. Courtès).

Notes and references

External links
 
 
 

Theatre criticism
20th-century French non-fiction writers
Alumni of the University of Oxford
French theatre critics
French women critics
1973 births
Living people